Camp Flaming Arrow is a year-round camping retreat in Hunt, Texas and is under ownership of the YMCA of Greater San Antonio for children ages 6–15 years old. Camp Flaming Arrow also has a L.I.T (leader in training) program during the summer for those 16 years of age. At 17, those who went through the L.I.T program may apply for their C.I.T (counselor in training) program.

History
Founded in 1927, the  camp site near the Guadalupe River serves nearly 7,000 people a year, and hosts family gatherings, conferences, organization retreats and summer camp.

References

External links
YMCA of Greater San Antonio & the Hill Country
Camp Flaming Arrow

Campgrounds in the United States
Flaming Arrow
1927 establishments in Texas
Buildings and structures in Kerr County, Texas
Flaming Arrow